The 26th Blue Dragon Film Awards ceremony was held on November 29, 2005 at the KBS Hall in Yeouido, Seoul, South Korea. Hosted by actors Jung Joon-ho and Kim Hye-soo, it was presented by Sports Chosun and broadcast on KBS.

Nominations and winners 
Complete list of nominees and winners:

(Winners denoted in bold)

References 

2006 film awards
Blue Dragon Film Awards
2006 in South Korean cinema